The 2015–16 Russian National Football League was the 24th season of Russia's second-tier football league since the dissolution of the Soviet Union. The season began on 11 July 2015 and is due to end on 21 May 2016.

Teams

Stadiums, personnel and sponsorship

League table

Results

Statistics

Scoring
 First goal of the season: Denis Klopkov for Luch-Energiya against SKA-Energiya Khabarovsk (11 July 2015)

Top goalscorers

Last updated: 10 May 2016

Hat-tricks

 4 Player scored 4 goals
 ** All goals scored from the penalty spot

Last updated: 8 November 2015

Attendance

Average home attendances

Ranked from highest to lowest average attendance.

Updated as of 8 November 2015

References

External links
Official website

2015–16 in Russian football leagues
Russian First League seasons
Rus